Chromate or chromat, and their derived terms, may refer to:

Chemistry 

 Chromate and dichromate, ions
 Monochromate, an ion
Trichromate, an ion
Tetrachromate, an ion
 Chromate conversion coating, a method for passivating metals

Biology 

Monochromacy (monochromate) having one color vision
Dichromatism (dichromate) having two color vision
Trichromacy (trichromate) having three color vision
Trichrome staining, a staining method
Tetrachromacy (tetrachromate) having four color vision

Other 

Chromat, a fashion label
Monochromatic or monochrome, images composed of one color (or values of one color)

See also
Chromite, a chromium-containing mineral
Chromite (compound), chemical compounds containing the (CrO2)− anion
Chrome (disambiguation)